Peapod Online Grocer (US), LLC is an American online grocery delivery service. By February 2022, it changed its name to Peapod Digital Labs.

The company is based in Chicago, IL and operated in several U.S. cities. It is owned by Netherlands-based Ahold Delhaize, which operates Stop & Shop, Food Lion, Giant-Landover in the USA, and other supermarkets in the Netherlands, Belgium, Luxembourg, Czech Republic, Greece, Serbia and Romania. It used to deliver from its own Chicago-area and other warehouses in the Midwest until its Midwest operations ceased in early 2020.

Peapod online grocery had operations in 24 U.S. urban markets, and was once the largest online grocery delivery company in the United States.

Overview

Peapod Online Grocer (US) was founded in 1989 by Andrew Parkinson and Thomas Parkinson. One early proposal for a name for the new company was IPOD, an acronym for Information and Product On Demand. The brothers, taking marketing considerations into account, decided on the friendlier sounding "Peapod" instead. Before 1996, Peapod Online Grocer (US) provided an online grocery shopping service in a partnership with Jewel supermarket in Chicago, Illinois and surrounding towns; Kroger in Columbus, Ohio; Randall's in Houston, Texas, and Safeway in San Francisco, California in 1993.

In 1996, the company launched its website and became one of the earliest internet start-ups; the company ranked 69th on the Inc. 500 list of fast-growing privately held U.S. companies. That year the company held an IPO on NASDAQ.  Between 1997 and 2000, Peapod expanded into Boston and Watertown, Massachusetts, Long Island, New York, and Norwalk, Connecticut in partnership with Stop & Shop. In late 2000, they added Washington, D.C. and surrounding towns through Giant of Landover, and in 2011 they also started serving the Philadelphia market with Giant of Carlisle and Manhattan with Stop & Shop.

In October 2017, Peapod Online Grocer (US) announced it was moving its headquarters from suburban Skokie, Illinois to downtown Chicago.

In 2019, Peapod held 9% of the online grocery delivery market in New York City, behind FreshDirect (68%), Instacart (13%), and Amazon Fresh (9%).

In February 2020, Peapod announced they would be ceasing operations in the Midwest (Illinois, Indiana, and Wisconsin) and focus exclusively on serving the East Coast. However, the headquarters for Peapod Digital Labs, which runs the e-commerce technology for Ahold Delhaize's U.S. grocery brands, remained in downtown Chicago.

In June 2000, global grocery corporation Royal Ahold bought 51% of Peapod's shares, and in August 2001, Royal Ahold bought out the entire company. As a result, Peapod cancelled its contracts with all grocery companies except for Royal Ahold's two main American chains, Stop & Shop and Giant Food (Giant-Landover and Giant-Carlisle). This caused Peapod to abandon Columbus, Houston, and San Francisco entirely.

Mobile app
In February 2012, Peapod introduced signs at some SEPTA Regional Rail stations in Philadelphia which enabled smartphone users to shop for groceries using Peapod's mobile app on their phone and scanning the barcodes of items listed on the signs. The grocery delivery occurred later in the day.

Recognition and awards
In 2017, Peapod Online Grocer (US) was listed as "one of the oldest and most popular online grocery services in the marketplace."

The NPD Group's Chief Food Industry Analyst, Harry Balzer, considers Peapod the top online grocery delivery service and believes that could be used as a model for delivery services, such as Amazon and Walmart, if they move into the business of online groceries.

See also

 List of online grocers

References

External links
 Official website

Ahold Delhaize
Companies based in Chicago
American companies established in 1989
Retail companies established in 1989
Transport companies established in 1989
Internet properties established in 1996
Online grocers
American grocers
Online retailers of the United States